The Outsider is a 1979 film thriller set largely in Belfast during The Troubles; it was the first film directed by Italian-American Tony Luraschi. The film is based on the book The Heritage of Michael Flaherty by Colin Leinster, and details the fictional experience of an idealistic Irish-American who travels to Ireland and joins the IRA in the 1970s.

Production
Luraschi, who had worked as an assistant director with Stanley Kramer and Roger Vadim, had never been to Ireland until 1976.
The company was unable to film in Northern Ireland, so instead made arrangement with a local residents' association to film the exterior scenes in the Dublin suburb of Ringsend.

Release
Despite the distributor's hope, the film was rejected by the 1979 London Film Festival. It opened at The Gate 2 cinema in Bloomsbury, London on 29 November 1979 during the festival.

Reception
The film caused a minor scandal where government officials were outraged at a scene that showed a British officer participating in the torture of a partially blind Irish Catholic prisoner.

New York magazine praised the direction "his skill at realistically conveying the terrible waste of the civil strife in Northern Ireland and the chilling day-to-day acceptance of violence as a way of life there. Unfortunately, the red-herring contrivances of his plot trivialize his powerful material."

Stepan O'Fetchit said "At the other extreme, modern-dress movies like Tony Luraschi's The Outsider... purport to present a real, contemporary Ireland while effectively reducing it to a traffic snarl-up of faceless ideologues wielding guns, balaclavas, and gritty one-liners."

Variety called it a "thoughtful terrorism drama" but felt that the "lack of concession on the part of director-scripter Tony Luraschi to conventional thriller pacing makes the Paramount-financed production no easy moneyspinner."

References

External links
 

1979 films
1979 thriller films
Films about the Irish Republican Army
Films about The Troubles (Northern Ireland)
Films set in Belfast
Films based on American novels
Films shot in Northern Ireland
Paramount Pictures films
Films scored by Ken Thorne
1970s English-language films